Raymond Ramsay was an English professional association football player of the 1920s. He joined Gillingham from Walsall in 1922 and went on to make three appearances for the club in The Football League.

References

Gillingham F.C. players
Walsall F.C. players
English footballers
English Football League players
Year of birth missing
Year of death missing
Association footballers not categorized by position